Wilhelm von Krosigk (20 November 1871 – 12 August 1953), was the German commander of the SMS Stettin.

He was born in 1871 in Germany. The SMS Stettin served in European waters during World War I, participating in the Battle of Heligoland Bight in 1914 and the Battle of Jutland in 1916. He died in 1953 in Germany.

References

1871 births
1953 deaths
Counter admirals of the Imperial German Navy
Counter admirals of the Reichsmarine